The 1938 UCI Road World Championships took place in Valkenburg, the Netherlands.

Events Summary

References

 
UCI Road World Championships by year
W
R
R